The Society of Seminary Teachers of Qom is an Iranian group founded in 1961/3 by the leading Muslim clerics of Qom. Established by the students of Ayatollah Khomeini after his exile to Iraq, it was formed in order to organize political activities of Khomeini's followers and promote his revolutionary interpretation of Islam, such as the idea of Islamic government. 
Since the 1979 revolution, it has largely become the body to keep the regime's registrar of who counts as a grand ayatollah, an Ayatollah and a Hojjat ul Islam. It has a head who is appointed by the Supreme Leader of the Islamic Republic. It currently heads the Supreme Council of Qom Hawzas, and proposes judges to the judiciary system. 
The body gained international prominence when it announced in 1981 that Ayatollah Shariatmadari was no longer a source of emulation (marja'). It has demoted a number of clerics over the last three decades.  A recent case was that of Ayatollah Yousef Saanei who for his solidarity with the green movement was demoted from marja' to hojatoleslam. The Society also includes Ayatollah Sistani on its list.

Founders

Its founders, none of whom were Ayatollahs at the time, were:
Fazel Lankarani
 Azari Qomi
 Ebrahim Amini
 Ali Meshkini 
 Hossein-Ali Montazeri
 Qoddusi
 Rabbani Shirazi

Current members

 Ayatollah Morteza Moghtadai 
 Grand Ayatollah Naser Makarem Shirazi 
 Grand Ayatollah Hossein Mazaheri
 Ayatollah Ahmad Khatami
 Ayatollah Ahmad Jannati
 Ayatollah Hashem Hosseini Bushehri

Late Members
Grand Ayatollah Mohammad Fazel Lankarani
Grand Ayatollah Moslem Malakouti
Grand Ayatollah Hussein-Ali Montazeri
Ayatollah Ali Meshkini
Ayatollah Abolghasem Khazali
Ayatollah Mohammad-Hadi Ma'refat
Ayatollah Ahmad Azari Qomi
Ayatollah Ebrahim Amini
 Ayatollah Mohammad Yazdi
 Ayatollah Mohammad Taqi Mesbah Yazdi

Activities

The Society approves a list of marjas in Qom. In 1963 the Society declared Ayatollah Khomeini as marja'. In 1994, after the death of Grand Ayatollah Mohammad Ali Araki, the Society nominated seven of the Ulama as his successors to be marja', including Ayatollah Khamenei.

In 2022, during Iranian_protests, the society urged the authorities to execute and use the amputation punishment to deter people from joining the protests.

See also
List of Ayatollahs
List of Maraji
Marja
Ayatollah
Ijtihad
History of principle-ism in Iran
Council for Spreading Mahmoud Ahmadinejad's Thoughts
Haghani Circle
 List of current Maraji
 List of deceased Maraji

References

Sources
رهبر خواست به فکر جانشین باشیم!
.:: پایگاه اطلاع رسانی حیات-صفحه اصلی ::.
History
خبرگزاری آفتاب - گمانه زنی ها: جنتی جایگزین مشکینی می شود
Iran Data Portal - Society of the Lecturers of Qom Seminary (JMHEQ)

Bibliography
The Society of Teachers from Qom Seminary from the Beginning to the present, Seyyed Mohsen Saleh and Alireza Javadzadeh, Publisher: Islamic Revolution Documentation Center

External links
Official Website

Khomeinist groups
Qom Province
Principlist political groups in Iran
Iranian clerical political groups
1961 establishments in Iran
Qom Seminary